The Bar-Steward Sons of Val Doonican are a British comedy folk and parody band from Barnsley, South Yorkshire.  Formed in 2006, they claim to be the hardest working comedy band in the UK, having played over 1200 shows throughout the UK. They are best known on the UK's festival scene, having played at major festivals including Glastonbury Festival, Cambridge Folk Festival, Beautiful Days, Bearded Theory, Rebellion Festival, Wychwood Festival, Kate Rusby's Underneath The Stars Festival, Towersey Festival, Wickham Festival and to an audience of 20,000 at Fairport's Cropredy Convention in August 2018, for their 900th show and again in 2022. Playing mainly acoustic folk instruments, they take popular songs and replace the lyrics with their own comedy reworkings, often on themes completely unrelated to the original song.  
They have independently released eleven studio albums (containing over 125 song parodies in total), and a large number of live albums.  
Presenting themselves as the long-lost children of Irish entertainer Val Doonican, and claiming to be "on a mission to keep their late, great spiritual father's legacy alive", the various members of the band have adopted the singer's surname for their shows, and wear brightly coloured hand-knitted tank-tops in tribute to Doonican's traditional knitwear.

History

Line-Up Mk.1 - Scott Doonican, Danny Doonican & Alan Doonican #1: June 2006 – March 2011
The band started out as an acoustic harmony duo consisting of Scott Doonican (vocals, acoustic guitar/banjo/mandolin/kazoo) and Danny Doonican (vocals, acoustic guitar), mainly covering quirky song choices by such disparate acts as Sparks, Queen, Judas Priest and Vera Lynn on folk instruments with Everly Brothers-styled harmonies.  

The band's name and subsequent image was the idea of Scott's partner and long-standing co-lyricist Amanda White, inspired after they both saw a poster in a music shop in Temple Bar for the San Diego band The Bastard Sons of Johnny Cash, whilst on a weekend break to Dublin. Over several drinks in Sinnotts Bar on King Street South, they took Scott's original suggestion that they should take the tough sounding 'The Bastard Sons of' and add someone who ironically wasn't seen as a macho character. They continued to list different crooners or musicians renowned for covering other people's music in an attempt to find something ironically humorous. The shortlist included Bert Weedon, Matt Monro and Perry Como, however the 'Bastard' was soon softened to 'Bar-Steward' under Amanda's suggestion that it would only result in the band getting limited bookings because of the harshness of the name. Eventually Amanda suggested and then settled on Val Doonican and the band's uniform of knitted tank tops was born, a deliberate tribute to the Irish singer's loud jumpers as worn on his British TV show from the 1960s to the early 1990s.

They played their first show at Thawleys Pub in Wombwell, Barnsley on Saturday 17 June 2006. The pub is now a local convenience store.  After their debut show, which was originally intended to be a one-off appearance, they decided to continue, and soon expanded to a three piece with the addition of Alan Doonican #1 on piano accordion, later self-releasing two albums of folky cover versions of classic rock songs (For Those About To Rock, Gently) and 1980s Number Ones (Back To The Day Job) on their independent Moon-On-A-Stick Records label, on which they continue to release albums to this day.

From 2008, the original line-up began to change direction to become a comedy/parody band by replacing the lyrics of popular songs with comedic alternatives of their own and performing in their native Yorkshire accent and dialect, the first being "Tarnlife", a re-working of Blur's "Parklife" with lyrics about the inhabitants of their home town of Barnsley. The spoken parts of the song, originally performed by Phil Daniels, were performed in 2008 by Scott's late father-in-law, Michael White, under the moniker of 'Barnsley Mick'. The band often make reference to the word 'Tarn' in their lyrics and in titles of songs and albums, which isn't a reference to mountain lakes formed by glaciation, but a local pronunciation of 'town'. As a local slang word, it is, however, given a capital letter, because it is often used as a proper noun by many local inhabitants, who affectionately call Barnsley 'Tarn'.

The song Tarnlife was later added to Cpl Kipper's Barnsley Trades Club Turn, their first full album as a comedy band, released in 2010. Its cover artwork mirrored that of Sgt. Pepper's Lonely Hearts Club Band by The Beatles, with 56 Barnsley celebrities gracing its front cover. The album was also notable for featuring the first of the band's several collaborations with guitarist Graham Oliver, founding member of heavy metal band Saxon.

Shortly after its release, Danny Doonican left the band, leaving Scott to complete the recording of 2011's The Dark Side Of The Tarn largely on his own. Unlike, Cpl. Kipper (which was a concept album of songs with links to their hometown of Barnsley), from their second album onwards, the focus of the band's songwriting became more universal.

Due to the significant number of line-up changes between 2010 and 2014, in 2017 Scott Doonican created a retrospective family tree for the band's website, showing the many incarnations of the band, which itself is a parody in the style of Pete Frame's Rock Family Trees. Each band member, past and present also has their own stage persona and their own individual elaborate backstory.

Line-Up Mk.2 - Scott Doonican, Alan Doonican #1 and Andy Doonican: April 2011 – April 2014
Danny Doonican was succeeded by Andy Doonican in 2011, and the line-up of Scott, Alan #1 and Andy recorded three further albums of parody songs between 2012 and 2014 ('EY UP! LET'S GO!, Sat'day Neet Fever and Talk Of The Tarn).

In August 2012, the band were booked to play the Levellers' Beautiful Days Festival. It was their busking performances around the festival site and their appearance on their two Band Stand slots that enabled the band to springboard on to the UK's festival circuit. In 2013, the band were rebooked for Beautiful Days, along with debut appearances at Bearded Theory and Watchet Music Festival.

On 22 June 2013 the band played on the roof of the former Blah Bar in Barnsley to open the 'Live In Barnsley' music festival, in an attempt to draw attention to their official set in the venue half an hour later. The band dressed as deceased rock stars, Freddie Mercury (Scott Doonican), Phil Lynott (Andy Doonican) and Elvis Presley (Alan Doonican). Scott Doonican was then invited in 2014 to organise the festival's finale with a band made up of The Bar-Steward Sons of Val Doonican alongside session musicians and guest singers from other local acts performing anthemic cover versions. This happened again in 2015 and 2016.

By April 2014, in a period of less than 24 hours, the band saw three new Doonican brothers deputising at shows in North Yorkshire, for the increasingly absent Andy Doonican, due to work and family commitments. Scott Doonican refers to this period of change in his book, Songs In The Key of Tarn as the band's 'Lost Weekend'. At an indoor festival at Harefield Hall, Pateley Bridge, on 19 April, Delmar Doonican joined Scott and Alan #1, on 5-string banjo, and the following afternoon, Duck Doonican (played by Simon Friend from Levellers) joined them on mandolin.

Line-Up Mk.3 - Scott Doonican, Alan Doonican #1, Björn Doonicansson and Andy Doonican: April – Sept 2014
Swedish-born Björn Doonicansson  then joined Scott and Alan #1 on the evening of 20 April 2014 for his first show (at The Blues Bar in Harrogate), originally as a part-time member on tenor banjo. Within two months he joined as a full-time member, expanding his duties to mandolin, fiddle and bouzouki too, and the band expanded to a somewhat flexible three or four-piece line-up.

Line-Up Mk.4 - Scott Doonican, Björn Doonicansson, Alan Doonican #2 and Andy Doonican: Oct 2014 – June 2016
Alan Doonican #1 unexpectedly left the band in September 2014, after the first night of a UK tour. 
This prompted Scott Doonican to have to place an advert on Facebook for a new accordionist, which read, "We are looking for someone that can play the accordion well, that is a nice bloke, with a GSOH, preferably called Alan". The call was answered within 36 hours, by Alan Doonican #2, whom, according to the band's website in an elaborate back-story, was Alan Doonican #1's twin brother from the second of a pair of IVF petri dishes. It goes on to claim that Alan Doonican #2's petri dish had been frozen for ten years, "whilst any underlying defects were ironed out".

Line-Up Mk.5 - Scott Doonican, Björn Doonicansson and Alan Doonican #2: June 2016 – present
Since late 2014, the core trio has been stable, with a line-up of Scott Doonican (vocals, guitar, synthesiser ukulele, banjulele, kazoo) being joined by Björn Doonicansson (violin, banjo, mandolin, bouzouki, vocals) and Alan Doonican #2 (piano accordion, keyboards, keytar, ukulele, vocals). From October 2014, the core trio played most shows, however, during the ensuing two year period, Andy Doonican continued to play much more sporadic shows with the band as an expanded four-piece (on 12-string guitar and bass), until retiring in June 2016, after the band's 10th birthday show.

During this period, the band recorded The Tarn Machine (2015) and T'South 0 – Tarn 4 (2016) as a four piece, while 2017's 'Ave It : Bold As Brass was recorded by the current trio of Scott, Björn and Alan #2.
The band refer to this consecutive trio of studio albums on their website as their Tarnetto Trilogy, itself a parody of the 'Cornetto Trilogy', likening them to the trilogy of films created by Simon Pegg, Nick Frost and Edgar Wright, in which each have their own significant colours (red, blue and green) and individual characteristics, but contain common themes throughout. The cover of The Tarn Machine mirrors the blood red colour of Shaun of the Dead, the cover of T'South 0 - Tarn 4 mirrors the alien green colour of The World's End, and the cover of 'Ave It : Bold As Brass mirrors the police force blue colour of Hot Fuzz.

In early 2018, the band re-recorded a collection of 21 of their most-loved songs for their ninth studio album, a ten-year retrospective of their comedy years, The Bar-Steward Sons of Val Doonican/2008–2018. The album was independently crowdfunded and released on CD, double disc coloured vinyl and limited edition cassette.

In December 2018, the band released two charity Christmas singles via iTunes. The first single was their final annual collaboration with Maartin Allcock, who had died four months before, only weeks after performing with the band at Fairport's Cropredy Convention. The track, a prog-rock/traditional folk crossover rendition of Greg Lake's I Believe In Father Christmas, entered the iTunes chart, peaking at Number 33, and gaining a Number 80 position on the UK Official Charts for both downloads and sales on 21 December 2018. The second single, The Gasman Cometh, entered the iTunes chart reaching Number 55, and the iTunes comedy chart at Number 2. In the same week The Bar-Steward Sons of Val Doonican/2008–2018 reached Number 2 in the iTunes comedy chart.  On 26 January 2019, spurred on by BBC Radio 6 ignoring an unprecedented barrage of fan requests for the song How Deep Is Your Glove? on social media, during a feature on Stuart Maconie's show called 'Sunday Glove Songs', the band defiantly released the track as a charity single for Prostate Cancer UK, and it entered the UK iTunes Comedy chart at Number 1.
 
Their tenth studio album, entitled Place Of Spades was crowdfunded in early 2019, and all pre-orders, came with a packet of 'Doonicans Magic Seeds', which at the time of their arrival at fans' homes, were of an unknown variety. In late April, fans were encouraged, on social media, to post photos of their plants, as they grew. Several months later, on 20 September, Scott Doonican finally admitted via the band's Facebook group, that they were actually cleome seeds, chosen because, when they grow, the leaves look remarkably similar to that of the cannabis plant. Scott, coming clean in his status post, stated, "I thought it would be a proper good laugh to try and get so many people to attempt to grow them, not knowing what they were growing. It worked, as over the past six months, I have had countless private messages from slightly worried fans (one of which lives next door to their local police station!)". The Place Of Spades album was released and launched on Sunday 30 June 2019 at Glastonbury Festival when the band played the Avalon Stage. A Glastonbury live album, Avalon Calling was recorded during the show, and was given a limited edition CD release, which, on its announcement, sold out overnight, before being made available via digital download, a second press with different packaging and later a double pink vinyl release.

In June 2019, Scott Doonican announced via social media and the band's website that he was setting up a crowdfunding project for a special release under the title of 'Leap of Faith'. 
Fans were told that for taking a 'leap of faith' and by pledging just ten pounds, they would definitely get a CD album on time for Christmas 2019, but that this would be expanded to a second album for the same price, if enough people backed the project. By August, it was announced that then unnamed CDs would be expanded to a triple disc release containing 44-tracks. When posted out to pledgers in December 2019, it was revealed that the three albums were actually re-recorded and re-mastered versions of the 'Three Flavours Tarnetto Trilogy' (The Tarn Machine, T'South 0 - Tarn 4, Ave It : Bold As Brass) created by the 2014-present trio line-up of Scott, Björn and Alan #2, and produced by Joel Howe, who had mixed and mastered The Bar-Steward Sons of Val Doonican/2008-2018 and Place Of Spades. On its release, Scott claimed on social media that the aim of the project was to demonstrate that "when a lot of people work collectively together, paying a little bit of money into the pot each, much bigger and better things can be achieved. I'm hoping that people can see now from my small-scale 'experiment', that socialism can work in the real world".

The band hosted their own music and comedy festival at The Old School House Venue in Barnsley in October 2019. The aptly titled Doonifest sold out over a year in advance, with a line-up including Oliver/Dawson Saxon, Hobo Jones & The Junkyard Dogs, The Sweetchunks Band and many other comedy and musical acts from the UK's festival circuit. It was the venue's fastest sell-out, with all tickets going within 56 seconds, before a single act was announced. The festival also saw, original founding member, Danny Doonican, returning for one final show, as the original duo of Scott and Danny opened the festival with a set composed of early Doonicans cover versions and songs from the band's first album.

On 25 October 2019, the band played their 1000th show at the Palace Theatre in Redditch. The show was a sell-out and was filmed and recorded for a DVD and CD live album.
 
In December 2019, Scott announced via the band website, a second 'Leap Of Faith' crowdfunding project, which eventually saw them release a 10th Anniversary version of their Cpl. Kipper's Barnsley Trades Club Turn album, in October 2020. The album, re-recorded by Scott Doonican, Björn Doonicansson and Alan Doonican, and released in the midst of the global coronavirus pandemic, in October 2020, also featured a host of special guests including Eliza Carthy, Dave Burland, Kate Rusby, Mike Harding, Graham Oliver, Hugh Whitaker, Kathryn Roberts, Ian McMillan, Barnsley blues-folk troubadour, Richard Kitson, and founder member Danny Doonican amongst others. The new version of the 'Barnsley Concept Album' was accompanied by a 120 page book written by Scott Doonican, entitled The Essential Listener's Guide To Cpl. Kipper's Barnsley Trades Club Turn, which contained the lyrics to the songs, and told the stories behind them and of the album's recording process.

In January 2020, the band's 10th studio album, Place Of Spades was the winner of a 'Jezzie Award' from Radio Bicester's 'Tarka Blowpig Music Show' after coming in at Number 1 and receiving the accolade of 'Studio Album of the Year - 2019', in a chart that featured The Who, Stormzy, Bruce Springsteen and Willie Nelson. Later in the same month, it was announced that the band would be supporting Levellers for their 2020 tour dates at Sheffield Leadmill, Holmfirth Picturedrome, Lancaster Town Hall and Nottingham Rock City. These shows were postponed until 2021 and 2022 due to a global pandemic of Coronavirus.

Spring 2020 – Winter 2021 The Coronavirus Pandemic, Scott Doonican's BIG NEET IN and the band's return to live shows
The 2020-2021 Global Coronavirus Pandemic caused the band to have to postpone their post-March 2020 tour dates, and as a result, Scott Doonican and his partner Amanda White, performed a series of weekly online shows, streamed on YouTube, under the title Scott Doonican's BIG NEET IN. The streamed gig was only meant to run for one show, but was very quickly established as a weekly staple of the pandemic, running for an initial 69 weeks in total on YouTube (the shows went out live but have been archived on YouTube). After a break, following a return to live shows, the online shows have continued on a more sporadic basis.

The shows featured Scott performing live from home in his music room, interspersed with some previously recorded video footage of the full band, new music videos and collaborations between Scott and special guests, including Kathryn Roberts, Eliza Carthy, both Jeremy Cunningham and Simon Friend from the Levellers, 3 Daft Monkeys and Frank Turner amongst many others.

The show also featured regular appearances from several puppet characters, each with their own individual catchphrases, voiced by Amanda including Morris the alien pub landlord quizmaster and his assistant Little Morris, Gloria McGlumpher the roving reporter, Gloria's super-hero obsessed nephew Gordon (The Crochet Kid), Gervais the Stylist, Percy the Puppet Rangler, the cowboy ranger Ilkley Moor Bart Hat, Grandpa McGlumpher (Gloria's father) and Wallace the Scottish Yeti amongst many others. Scott contributed the voice of Barnsley Bob Ross, a finger puppet character based on American artist Bob Ross with a Barnsley accent and dialect.

Beginning in March 2020, BIG NEET IN clocked up 41 weekly shows up until a New Year Hootenanny, and then continued on a weekly basis into 2021, up to show number 66 in June, which featured a four-part interview with Gloria McGlumpher and a guest collaboration between Frank Turner and the band for its weekly basis 'finale'. Along with Scott, Björn and Alan, Frank Turner performed a version of his own song The Road, which combined the song's original lyrics and the parody lyrics Scott Doonican wrote for the band's 1000th show. The 66th episode of BIG NEET IN was also the 1100th Doonicans show. Shows 67 and 68 were compilation shows hosted by Gloria Glumpher, whilst show 69 was recorded in front of a virtual audience via conferencing platform Zoom. The show has continued into 2022 with more sporadic episodes after 2021's Episode 66 'finale' which actually marked the band's return to live performances.

During the pandemic lockdowns, Scott and Amanda converted their garage into a pub, which was named The Pint & Puppet after their Saturday night exploits. A regular extension to their 2-3 hour livestream shows, would be an 'After-Show Party' in The Pint & Puppet, where Scott would play some covers of other artists, which would be broadcast via Facebook Live.

The fourth episode of Scott Doonican's BIG NEET IN on 18 April 2020 raised  over £3000 for a local appeal to help to pay for material to make scrubs for Barnsley's NHS workers, due to the government's shortage of Personal Protective Equipment. After Amanda's mother passed away in Barnsley Hospital in November, after contracting the virus whilst in the hospital, the show that followed on 7th Nov 2020 (Show 33) raised over £2000 for the hospital ward she had been in at the time.  

Although the band were announced to be playing at Bearded Theory, Fairport's Cropredy Convention, Beautiful Days Festival, Camper Calling, Underneath The Stars Festival, Wickham Festival, Costa Del Folk, Watchet Festival and several others in 2020, due to the pandemic, the festivals were postponed to 2021 or 2022 or cancelled.

On 1 May 2020, Scott Doonican announced via social media and a YouTube video promo, that the band would be hoping to release their 11th studio album, Rugh & Ryf in 2021. The artwork was revealed too, a pastiche of Fairport Convention's' 1969 classic album Leige & Lief, which Scott revealed had been approved by the remaining members of the Fairport Convention line-up that played on the original album. Former Fairport Convention drummer Dave Mattacks and current bassist Dave Pegg both contributed parts to the opening track of the album. The title of the original album Leige & Lief means 'Loyal & Ready' in Middle English. Rugh & Ryf is Middle English for 'Rough & Ready'. Despite this, due to the global pandemic, the decision was made to shelf the new album until 2022.

Also during the coronavirus lockdown, Scott Doonican made a guest appearance on a version of Fairport Convention's Meet On The Ledge, featuring the members of Fairport Convention, Clannad, Turin Brakes, Ralph McTell, Martyn Joseph and many more. The song was released as a charity single to raise money for people in the music industry affected by the pandemic.

In March 2021, the band successfully crowd-funded a double live vinyl release of their 2019 Glastonbury Festival performance Avalon Calling, which was released in August 2021 on time for the band's second Sunday Service show at Beautiful Days Festival in Devon. The show saw the band take to the stage with a number of guests, with bassist Mojo Doonican returning to join the band for the set, and Keith Moonican on drums.

In November 2021, Scott Doonican and his partner Amanda White performed Scott Doonican's Big Neet Out at a sold out Lantern Theatre in Sheffield, a live stage version of their long-running lockdown show, which included all of Amanda's puppet characters taking part in the show from a home-made Punch & Judy tent located to the left of Scott on the stage. The show was recorded and filmed for a live release.

The following weekend, the whole band commenced their first tour in two years. The tour, which featured theatre-show dates in Salford, Ulpha, Banbury, Canterbury, Knutsford, Preston, York, Matlock Bath and Barnsley, also included three dates supporting the Levellers at Sheffield Leadmill, Morecambe Winter Gardens and Nottingham Rock City.

Spring 2022 – present
The band played sporadic shows in Spring 2022, including a performance at Whitby Steampunk Festival at Whitby Pavilion Theatre, a double bill with Thomas Benjamin Wild Esq. In April, Thomas Benjamin Wild was invited by Scott Doonican to be a special guest on BIG NEET IN #78 and they collaborated on a rendition of an unabridged version of Bat Out Of Hell by Meat Loaf.

The band did a three night residency at Holmfirth Picturedrome in West Yorkshire, supporting the Levellers between 12 and 14 May 2022.

As well as band shows in Spring, Scott Doonican performed a series of intimate shows testing all of the new material from the band's forthcoming studio album. Live recordings were made at shows in Stourbridge, Sheffield and Trowbridge, and the Sheffield show was given an official release as a solo live album, Your Evening Of Folk Has Been Cancelled, released simultaneously with the band's new studio album as a bonus album to those who pre-ordered it.

In May 2022, the band released their eleventh studio album, Rugh & Ryf, after shelving it for two years due to coronavirus lock downs as a result of the global pandemic. The album was crowd-funded and was given the official launch date of 29 May when the band made their main stage debut supporting The Flaming Lips at Bearded Theory Festival in Derbyshire. Fans who pre-ordered the physical album received it on 1 May on time for a listening party organised by the band on social media.

Over the summer of 2022 the band played a series of notable UK music festivals including Barnsley folk singer Kate Rusby's Underneath The Stars Festival, Wickham Festival, Fairport Convention's Cropredy Festival, the Levellers' Beautiful Days Festival and Watchet Festival in Somerset on the same weekend bill as Belinda Carlisle, The Fratellis and Level 42.

In September the band released a limited edition live double CD of their two shows (in 2018 and 2022) at Fairport's Cropredy Convention. The album cover featured original artwork by the American artist Paine Proffitt and depicted the three members of the band jumping in the air. A time-lapse video of Proffitt creating the artwork was uploaded to the band's YouTube account.

On 8 October 2022 Scott Doonican and his partner Amanda hosted THE BIG DAY OUT, an indoor music festival featuring 12 acts at Barnsley's Birdwell Venue. The festival had sold out earlier in the year, and was compered by the puppets from Scott Doonican's BIG NEET IN via video screens in the venue. The Bar-Steward Sons of Val Doonican performed with the same extended 'Big Band' line-up that performed at Beautiful Days Festival in August 2022, which included Lewis Ryan on bass guitar and Brazilian drummer Dalgas Klein, both from Barnsley-based alternative band The Rolling Down Hills.

On 5 November 2022 Scott Doonican's BIG NEET IN #81 saw Gloria McGlumpher interviewing folk musician Eliza Carthy and a new music video, produced by Scott Doonican, was premiered on the show for Carthy's cover of Good Morning Mr Walker by The Mighty Sparrow, taken from her album Queen of the Whirl, recorded to celebrate her 30th anniversary in the music industry. The song and video featured Eliza Carthy and a host of special musical guests including Scott Doonican and the show's puppet cast. 

The Bar-Steward Sons of Val Doonican's 2022 'Winter Woollies Tour', which started in early November until mid December, was preceded by two sold out nights at The Lantern Theatre in Sheffield. The first night saw Scott Doonican and Björn Doonicansson performing their Desert Island Discs live, whilst being interviewed by puppet hostess Gloria McGlumpher (voiced by Amanda White), and the second night saw Scott and Amanda performing the sequel to their 'Scott Doonican's BIG NEET OUT' show, featuring Scott performing songs and sketches alongside the puppet cast of the couple's online lockdown show. A live album and film was recorded on the second night and was crowdfunded and released independently to fans. 
The trio of Scott, Björn and Alan undertook the remaining sold out dates in Whimple in Devon, Bridgwater, Preston, Knutsford, two nights in Banbury, York and Matlock Bath. The band's last show of 2022 was in their home town of Barnsley, where they performed in their annual Christmas Rock & Roll Circus which also included the pantomime 'The Doonicans Vs. The Fly'. Scott Doonican's BIG NEET IN returned for online shows on Christmas Eve and a New Year's Eve 'Hootenanny'.

At the outset of 2023 Scott Doonican undertook a series of solo shows in Ipswich, Canterbury and Stourbridge, before the band played their first show of the year at the Rescue Rooms in Nottingham. This show marked the point at which Alan Doonican #2 surpassed the 3024 days spent in the band by his predecessor Alan Doonican #1. The current line-up of the band is now made-up of the three longest-serving members. Also in the same month Scott Doonican announced that a third 'Leap of Faith' project would take place during 2023 in which fans would pledge an amount of money for an undisclosed CD and vinyl crowdfunded release. Festival dates were announced for Bearded Theory, Beautiful Days, Ely Folk Festival, Shrewsbury Folk Festival, Lindisfarne Festival and a second BIG DAY OUT festival, after the success of the 2022 event.

Influences
Scott Doonican, in an interview with Farmer Phil's Festival in 2016, named his musical comedy influences as Mike Harding, Jasper Carrott and Richard Digance.  On the band's website, Scott also claims to have formed the band, "to fuse the theatrical stage antics of Freddie Mercury with the comedy of Mike Harding, in order to form the world's greatest folk-band in knitwear".
From January to April 2015, the band released a series of  Doonican Desert Island Discs Podcasts via Bandcamp, where each month, different members were interviewed by Scott Doonican's partner Amanda White (who performed in a mock Scottish accent to emulate Kirsty Young who was the presenter of the real Desert Island Discs at that time). The band members had to choose their favourite eight songs, a book and a luxury item. Scott Doonican's selections included Eliza Carthy, Mike Harding, Rory Gallagher, Half Man Half Biscuit and Queen. Björn Doonicansson's selections included AC/DC, The Dubliners and Swedish rock band Europe. Alan Doonican's selections included American Zydeco accordion player Clifton Chenier, Deep Purple and Fairport Convention. Notably, all three of the band members each chose a different Levellers song.

Live shows
The band have played over 1,200 shows to date, and proclaim on their website that they are "The hardest-working comedy band in the UK".
The band's present day live shows range from full band shows, to duo shows by Scott & Björn, to solo acoustic shows by Scott. The band are regulars on the UK festival scene, and have also supported a number of diverse acts including Levellers, Chas & Dave, Roy Wood, John Otway, Fairport Convention, Eliza Carthy, Tony Christie, The Flaming Lips and The Darkness.

Shows are often enhanced by audience participation and various set-pieces, such as the addition of occasional guest appearances from 6 ft 9in tall Tom Large dressed as The Devil for their version of "The Devil Went Darn To Barnsley" (where The Devil dares Björn to beat his fiddle playing, the forfeit being Björn's soul) and Scott crowd surfing to the bar and back to get and bring back a pint of beer; at several large festival shows, including Fairport's Cropredy Convention, Glastonbury Festival, Beautiful Days and Bearded Theory, Scott has used a rubber dinghy for this part of the show.

The band regularly invite other musicians to play with them. At Fairport's Cropredy Convention in August 2018, former Fairport Convention multi-instrumentalist Maartin Allcock, complete with Doonican-style tank-top, joined them for the finale on bass guitar, at Beautiful Days 2017 they were joined by Eliza Carthy, and at Whitwell Festival of Music in 2015, they were joined by Graham Oliver guitarist and founding member of Yorkshire heavy metal band Saxon. Scott also joined Oliver/Dawson Saxon on stage that same evening, brandishing a banjulele for Saxon song Wheels Of Steel (which the Doonicans covered as a hidden track on their 2017 album, '''Ave It : Bold As Brass), and again at the band's own 'Doonifest' in October 2019.

In February 2019, the band announced the date for their 1000th show, to take place at the Palace Theatre in Redditch, Worcestershire on 25 October 2019. The show, which is currently the band's biggest selling ticketed headline show to date, sold out on Sun 22 September. The band later announced and successfully crowdfunded a project to film and record a live DVD and double album on the night of the show.

In August 2019, the band were invited to host their first 'Sunday Service' show at The Big Top stage at Beautiful Days, where the band performed a full set of their comedy parodies with guest collaborations from other acts on the festival circuit, including fellow Barnsley folk musician Kathryn Roberts who performed The Lady In Greggs as a piano duet. Kathryn duetted with Scott during his 15th online 'BIG NEET IN' show, which was broadcast on YouTube during the worldwide coronavirus pandemic of 2020. They performed a parody of the Joe Cocker & Jennifer Warnes song, Up Where We Belong about Barnsley sculptor, Graham Ibbeson's statue located in Barnsley, of the cricketing umpire Dickie Bird. The following week, folk singer Eliza Carthy duetted with Scott on the song Prince Ali from the Disney animated movie Aladdin, whilst she was dressed as the Genie from the movie. In Feb 2021, Jeremy Cunningham from the Levellers contributed a live video recording of an art mural painted on the wall of the band's Brighton studio, The Metway, for Big Neet In #48, which was set to the sound of the band's hit single What A Beautiful Day as performed by Scott Doonican. Simon Friend from Levellers collaborated with Scott Doonican on the show, performing War Pigs by Black Sabbath.

Reception
Jeff Robson, reviewing their 11 August 2018 show at Fairport's Cropredy Convention for the Independent, said "... The Bar Steward Sons of Val Doonican were the highlights of a rainy Saturday afternoon, swearily lampooning a genre that sometimes takes itself too seriously.", whilst another review of the same show said "... complete with fluorescent tank tops and dodgy wigs [they] were an absolute highlight."

Talking about the same appearance in a 4 December interview with Radio Bicester on the Tarka Blowpig Show, Fairport Convention's Dave Pegg, said that the band were "the best... the highlight of the weekend".

Reviewing the band's support act to the Levellers at Leamington Assembly in 2015, What's On West Midlands said "the Barnsley Boys left the audience in stitches with their exquisitely crafted parodies ... there was nevertheless some surprisingly excellent musicianship."

John Atkin, reviewing 'Ave It: Bold As Brass in RnR Magazine, said "Bristles with proper belly-laugh moments... a LOL-a-minute through a variety of perfect pastiches. If there is any justice, the Doonicans deserve to be all over your Saturday night telly."

In a review of Bearded Theory Festival 2016, UK Festival Guides said "I couldn't fail to mention a gig by The Bar-Steward Sons of Val Doonican that left even them speechless at the sheer size, volume and enthusiasm of the audience, the impact these boys have wherever they go is utterly phenomenal", whilst at the same festival two years later, the reviewer noted "Rapidly becoming the must-have, must-see festival band, the Bar-Steward Sons of Val Doonican played to an over-capacity Woodland Stage arena as hundreds queued for a chance at catching their much-anticipated antics". A review of a smaller venue show said "They simply take all the songs you cannot get out of your head – everything from The Police to Kings of Leon – and twist the lyrics beyond recognition while wearing gloriously outrageous multi-coloured tank tops."

In July 2017, comedian Jason Manford described their performance at Underneath The Stars Festival as "great fun" on his Twitter account, whilst eFestivals described their performance at Off The Tracks festival the same year with "Like a modern-day version of the Barron Knights, they take popular songs, amend the words and twist them into hilarious folk parodies."
Manford saw the band again at Underneath The Stars Festival on Sat 30 July 2022, and via Instagram said that "when the North goes independent I'm suggesting this is our national anthem" with an attached video of the band performing their ode to 'real gravy', 'Too Good To Be Jus'.

In the foreword of Scott Doonican's book of the band's lyrics Songs In The Key Of Tarn, folk musician Eliza Carthy describes the band as "a ridiculous family of genius, hilarious, irresistible music makers, currently crowd surfing to the bar all over the great county of Yorkshire and beyond, into the venues and music festivals of the UK".

Folk musician and comedian Mike Harding said on his "Folk Show" podcast #177 in 2016 that "The Bar-Steward Sons of Val Doonican are very, very funny... one of the hardest working bands on the planet". In the broadcast of his 273rd Folk Show podcast in Sept 2019 he described the band as "some of the funniest men on the planet... I would call them parodists extraordinaire".  On 12 April 2019, the Staffordshire Sentinel published a headline about the band's appearance at Leek Arts Festival, describing them to be "like The Barron Knights - on speed", going on to say "Their hilarious parodies of popular songs will leave you crying tears of laughter".

Mike Scialom, writing for the Cambridge Independent, said that the band's headline set at Cambridge Folk Festival's Club Stage was "another festival highlight". It went on to say that the "irreverent, madcap trio, insisting they were quite posh really, included defence of their home town, Barnsley: 'In most cities people smoke spice, but in Barnsley everyone smokes basil... they buy the Radio Times when it's not even Christmas, that's how posh it is'."

During their appearance at Kate Rusby's Underneath The Stars Festival in August 2019, in a review by Louder Than War journalist Gareth Allen wrote, "The Bar-Steward Sons of Val Doonican's reputation preceded them and they didn't disappoint, resplendent in the most garish of tank tops imaginable... without doubt these guys can really play. Led by the inimitable Scott Doonican, everyone is jumping, as metal-head culture joins folk and hip-hop in an intoxicating mix". The Yorkshire Evening Post described the band at the same show as "hilarious".

RnR Magazine, reviewing Place Of Spades in September 2019, described the album as "the summit of musical comedy. Scott Doonican's attention to detail is what sets the Doonicans ahead of all the contenders in this genre. These are lovingly crafted pastiches with tonnes of subtle layers". They went on to say that it was "the strongest Doonicans album yet".

During a Lives In Music interview with Robin Valk, in March 2020, Fairport Convention bassist Dave Pegg said, "one band I really love, are a bit of a comedy act, and an act that you will wanna go and see over and over again, called The Bar-Steward Sons of Val Doonican... a great name, but absolutely hilarious."

On 6 July 2020, via her Underneath The Stars Festival social media, folk singer Kate Rusby said, "The 8th wonder of the world is actually in Yorkshire... a wonderful Yorkshire genius collective known as The Bar-Steward Sons of Val Doonican. To see them is to know true magnificence and we love em to bits!"

During the final interview of Scott Doonican's BIG NEET IN (lead by puppet anchor-lady Gloria McGlumpher - voiced by Scott Doonican's partner Amanda White along with Scott during show #66), guest collaborator and interviewee Frank Turner described his experience as "the best interview I have ever done".

At Bearded Theory Festival in Derbyshire on Sunday 29 May 2022, Wayne Coyne from headline act The Flaming Lips said to Scott Doonican on seeing the band's stage wear, "Oh man! You guys look even crazier than us!".

In the July/August 2022 edition of RnR Magazine, the band's 11th studio album, Rugh & Ryf, was described as the band's "masterpiece... with lyrics full of pith and vinegar, wrapped in dubious DayGlo knitwear... that will have the folkies quaking to the depths of their Trad. Arr. souls".

Jarvis Cocker from Sheffield band, Pulp, has been widely quoted to have described the band as "The best thing to come out of Barnsley, since the A61 to Sheffield".

 Notable instruments 

 Scott Doonican 
Scott Doonican has been an official endorsee of Tanglewood Guitars since 2018, but has had a preference for them for live shows since the band's conception. According to their website his main live acoustic guitar, a "battered old 1995 Tanglewood TW55, dubbed 'The Workhorse' (is) believed to have done well over a thousand shows to date" (since this was written, the guitar definitely has). The guitar was bought in 1999 from Scott's uncle, former Showaddywaddy bassist, Billy Norman.
Scott also plays a 'chess board synthesiser ukulele', custom-built by North Yorkshire luthier, Robert Hinchcliffe, during She's From Dodworth, and occasionally he plays a 1981 Suzuki Omnichord OM-27 during solo shows.
He also sometimes plays an Ozark banjulele, a GDAD tuned Irish bouzouki, and the 'Kazoobie Wazoogle', an extra-loud kazoo with a bell-shaped horn on top and a trumpet-styled opening at the front. 
On studio albums between 2015 and 2020, Scott recorded his acoustic guitar parts using a Gibson J200 and since 2020 records using a George Lowden O23C.

 Björn Doonicansson 

Björn Doonicansson plays a Gold Tone TS-250A Tenor Archtop Banjo (and a Deering Goodtime 2 Leader as his back-up tenor banjo), a Bridge Aquila violin made by Sleaford violin-maker, Paul Bridgewater, and an electric Fender MandoStrat mandolin.

 Alan Doonican 
Alan Doonican plays Gallini and Chanson accordions, a Roland V-Combo VR-09 keyboard (dubbed "Alan's Massive Throbbing Organ" on the side of his keyboard stand), a 1987 Yamaha SHS-10 keytar, and a ukulele of ill repute.

 Discography 

This is an abridged list of albums; the band have also released over 40 live shows on CD or in download format, via their own independent label, Moon-On-A-Stick Records. All of the artwork for the front covers of the band's studio albums, and a significant number of their live albums are pastiches of classic album covers.

Studio albums
 For Those About To Rock... But Gently (2007)
 Back To The Day Job (2009)
 Cpl Kipper's Barnsley Trades Club Turn (2010)
 The Dark Side Of The Tarn (2011)
 EY UP! LET'S GO! (2012)
 Sat'day Neet Fever (2013)
 Talk Of The Tarn (2014)
 The Tarn Machine (2015 - re-recorded & re-released 2019)
 T'South 0 – Tarn 4 (2016 - re-recorded & re-released 2019)
 Ave It: Bold As Brass (2017)
 The Bar-Steward Sons of Val Doonican/2008-2018 (2018)
 Place Of Spades (2019)
 Cpl. Kipper's Barnsley Trades Club Turn - 10th Anniversary Edition (2020)
 Rugh & Ryf (2022)

Live albums
The band have released countless live albums since their conception, all self-released. Some have been given a physical release and there are many more released digitally as part of the band's regularly expanding 'Official Bar-Steward Bootlegs Series'.
Physical releases with the current line-up include:
 Get Yer Ha-Ha's Art (2016) Recorded live at The Lantern Theatre, Sheffield. 
 School's Art (2017) Recorded live at The Old School House Venue, Barnsley. 
 Avalon Calling (2019) Recorded live at Glastonbury Festival. The album was given a vinyl release in 2021.
 The Bar-Steward Sons of Val Doonican Live At The Palace Theatre (2019) Recorded live at the Palace Theatre, Redditch on 25 October 2019, the night of the band's 1000th show.
 The Bar-Steward Sons of Val Doonican Live At Fairport's Cropredy Convention 2018 & 2022 (2022) Recorded live at Fairport's Cropredy Convention in 2018 and 2022.

Other media
DVDsThe Tarn Machine Live (2015)Live & Lairy at Fairport's Cropredy Convention (2018)
 The Bar-Steward Sons of Val Doonican Live At The Palace Theatre (2019) Filmed live at the Palace Theatre, Redditch on 25 October 2019, the night of the band's 1000th show.

Books
 Songs In The Key Of Tarn (2015) A book of the band's lyrics and the stories behind them, written by Scott Doonican, with a foreword written by Eliza Carthy MBE. The book was revised for a significantly extended 2nd edition in 2017.
 The Essential Listener's Guide To Cpl. Kipper's Barnsley Trades Club Turn (2020) A book to accompany the 10th Anniversary version of Cpl. Kipper's Barnsley Trades Club Turn, containing the lyrics and stories behind the songs along with commentary on the recording process, written by Scott Doonican, with a foreword written by Ringo Starr MBE

 Members 
The band's current core trio of Scott, Björn and Alan #2 has been stable since 2014.  
A number of former members, occasional members and additional guests have also performed with the band over the years.

 Current members 

Scott Doonican
Lead vocals, acoustic guitar, banjulele, electric synthesiser ukulele, Suzuki Omnichord OM-27, kazoo, dinghy (17 June 2006 – present)

Scott has been the only constant member throughout the band's history. He has played at every single Bar-Steward Sons show, except show #513 at the Rescue Rooms in Nottingham on 18 October 2014.

He has written or co-written the lyrics to over 100 of the band's parodies. Despite his best efforts he still doesn't have an Ivor Novello Award.

Björn Doonicansson
Mandolin, tenor banjo, violin, bouzouki, guitar, vocals (20 April 2014 – present)

Hailing from a small goat-herding village close to Gothenburg, Sweden, Björn is the youngest member of the band's '2014–present' line-up. He played for the first time with the band at The Blues Bar in Harrogate at show #426 in April 2014, aged only 16 at the time.
He is currently the second-longest serving member of the band (after Scott Doonican).

Alan Doonican #2
Piano accordion, keyboards, keytar, ukulele, vocals, and according to a weekly Facebook phenomena is alleged to be the Eye Candy of the band (25 October 2014 – present)

Alan played for the first time with the band at Harefield Hall in Pateley Bridge at show #514 on 25 October 2014, at Halloween-themed festival, 'Scarefest'. The festival appearance doubled-up as a 'live audition', after Alan Doonican #1 had quit the band unexpectedly the previous month. At first, the rest of the band couldn't spot him amongst the rest of the festival crowd, as everybody in attendance was in Halloween fancy dress.

Since joining the band, Alan has written or co-written over fourteen of the band's best-known parodies, including The Ornithologist Waltz, Walking In Manpiss and Too Good To Be Jus.

He became the third-longest serving member of the band on 4 February 2023 at a sold out show at the Rescue Rooms in Nottingham, after surpassing the 3024 days served in the band by his predecessor Alan Doonican #1.

 Former members 
 Danny Doonican – vocals, acoustic guitar (17 June 2006 – 17 March 2011)
 Alan Doonican #1 – piano accordion (24 June 2006 – 4 October 2014)
 Andy Doonican – 12-string acoustic guitar, bass guitar, ukulele (8 April 2011 – 17 June 2016)

Collaborators, honorary members and notable guests
 Amanda White - co-writer of a significant percentage of the band's parodies, alongside Scott Doonican, regular band photographer and in charge of band merchandise at live shows since 2006. Amanda was also responsible for giving the band its name and subsequent unique image. Scott has long described her as 'The Fourth Doonican', even during the period where the band expanded to become a quartet between 2014 and 2016. During the 2020 coronavirus pandemic the band were forced to cancel live shows, and Scott Doonican presented a weekly BIG NEET IN livestream show on YouTube. Amanda co-presented the show using and voicing a range of puppet characters, including Gloria McGlumpher the Big Neet In Roving Reporter (who interviewed band members, various special guests, and people close to the band), Gordon McGlumpher (Gloria's young nephew), Morris the Quizmaster (an alien with three eyes, who is alleged to run Scott Doonican's home-built pub 'The Pint & Puppet') and Gervaise (the band's stylist and hairdresser) amongst others.
 Maart Doonican (Maartin Allcock) – producer and multi-instrumentalist on several studio tracks including annual Christmas singles (2015-2017). Maartin was given Scott's EY UP! LET'S GO! tank-top and made an "honorary Doonican" for his only live performance with the band at Fairport's Cropredy Convention on 11 August 2018. He died, just 35 days later after a short battle with liver cancer. 
 Duck Doonican (Simon Friend from Levellers) – played mandolin on the live album It'll Be Reight (2014) and has made two live appearances to date.
 Mojo Doonican - made his debut on bass guitar and tambourine with the band at The Bar-Steward Sons of Val Doonican's Sunday Service at Beautiful Days Festival 2019. Sporting an afro, sunglasses and silvery flares, Mojo remained mute for the duration of the show, communicating by coolly staring at his brothers. He is alleged to come from Coolville, Ohio. He also guested on bass on Big Coffee Brand and Frisky In The Jar from the 2019 reissue of The Tarn Machine and on Dead Right Hand from Rugh & Ryf in 2022. He has made occasional appearances with the band since 2019.
 Keith Moonican - played drums as part of the Doonicans' Sunday Service Gospel Orchestra (consisting of just himself and Mojo Doonican on bass) at the second incarnation of The Bar-Steward Sons of Val Doonican's Sunday Service at Beautiful Days Festival in August 2021, and made occasional appearances since 2021.
 Delmar Doonican – played 5-string banjo on the live album It'll Be Reight (2014) and as a guest on the tracks Whole Lotta Rosé from Talk Of The Tarn (2014) and Place Of Spades from the album of the same name (2019).
 Foxy Doonican – acoustic guitar, bass guitar, banjo (made four live appearances between 31 May 2014 and 18 October 2014)
 Bobby Doonegan – occasional appearances on tea-chest bass (25 May 2014 – present). Bobby has been described on the band's website as a distant cousin and the son of lesser-known skiffle star, Lenny Doonegan. 
 Sarah Doonican – occasional British Sign Language interpreter at live shows (21 May 2015 – present) has performed several times alongside the band at Bearded Theory Festival and at a handful of other shows in Derbyshire, inclusively translating the band's comedy lyrics for deaf festival or gig-goers. In the similar way to how the core band members refer to each other as "brothers from other mothers", they refer to Sarah as their "sister from the same mister". 
 Joel Howe (music producer) - often described by Scott Doonican as 'The Fifth Doonican' (a subtle reference to Beatles producer George Martin), he has mixed and mastered a number of the band's albums since 2017, including studio albums Ave It : Bold As Brass (2017), The Bar-Steward Sons of Val Doonican/2008-2018 (2018), Place Of Spades (2019), and the reissued versions of The Tarn Machine and T' South 0 - Tarn 4 (2019), Cpl. Kipper's Barnsley Trades Club Turn (2020), Rugh & Ryf (2022), as well as live albums, Live & Lairy at Fairport's Cropredy Convention (2018), Avalon Calling - Live At Glastonbury Festival (2019) and The Bar-Steward Sons of Val Doonican Live At The Palace Theatre (2019).
 Tom Large – occasional appearances as Björn's nemesis The Devil (or Tom DeVille) at live shows (since show #555 on 21 May 2015 – present)
 Lewis Ryan - played bass in 2022 with the band's extended 'Sunday Service Big Band' at both Beautiful Days Festival in Devon and THE BIG DAY OUT Festival in Barnsley. Also a fine artist, Ryan  created the inner gatefold artwork for The Bar-Steward Sons of Val Doonican/2008-2018.
 Dalgas Klein - played drums in 2022 with the band's extended 'Sunday Service Big Band' at both Beautiful Days Festival in Devon and THE BIG DAY OUT Festival in Barnsley. Both Klein and Lewis Ryan perform regularly with Barnsley alt-grunge band The Rolling Down Hills.
 Helga Doonicansson - Björn Doonicansson's younger sister, credited for backing vocals on Pub DJ on the album Ave It : Bold As Brass''.

References

External links
 Official website
 Official Bandcamp

British parodists
English folk musical groups
British comedy musical groups
Parody musicians
Musical groups established in 2006
Musicians from Barnsley